In mathematics, the Rokhlin lemma, or Kakutani–Rokhlin lemma is an important result in ergodic theory. It states that an aperiodic measure preserving dynamical system can be decomposed to an arbitrary high tower of measurable sets and a remainder of arbitrarily small measure. It was proven by Vladimir Abramovich Rokhlin and independently by Shizuo Kakutani. The lemma is used extensively in ergodic theory, for example in Ornstein theory and has many generalizations.

Terminology

Rokhlin lemma belongs to the group mathematical statements such as Zorn's lemma in set theory and Schwarz lemma in complex analysis which are traditionally called lemmas despite the fact that their roles in their respective fields are fundamental.

Statement of the lemma 

We assume  is (measurably) aperiodic, that is, the set of periodic points for  has zero measure. Then for every integer  and for every , there exists a measurable set  such that the sets  are pairwise disjoint and such that .

A topological version of the lemma

Let  be a topological dynamical system consisting of a compact metric space  and a homeomorphism . The topological dynamical system  is called minimal if it has no proper non-empty closed -invariant subsets. A topological dynamical system  is called a factor of  if there exists a continuous surjective mapping  which is equivariant, i.e.,  for all .

Elon Lindenstrauss proved the following theorem:

Theorem: Let  be a topological dynamical system which has an aperiodic minimal factor. Then for integer  there is a continuous function  such that the set  satisfies  are pairwise disjoint.

Gutman proved the following theorem:

Theorem: Let  be a topological dynamical system which has an aperiodic factor with the small boundary property. Then for every , there exists a continuous function  such that the set  satisfies , where  denotes orbit capacity.

Further generalizations 
 There are versions for non-invertible measure preserving transformations.
 Donald Ornstein and Benjamin Weiss proved a version for free actions by countable discrete amenable groups. 
 Carl Linderholm proved a version for periodic non-singular transformations.

References

Notes 
 Vladimir Rokhlin. A "general" measure-preserving transformation is not mixing. Doklady Akademii Nauk SSSR (N.S.), 60:349–351, 1948.
 Shizuo Kakutani. Induced measure preserving transformations. Proc. Imp. Acad. Tokyo, 19:635–641, 1943.
 Benjamin Weiss. On the work of V. A. Rokhlin in ergodic theory. Ergodic Theory and Dynamical Systems, 9(4):619–627, 1989.
 . Some old and new Rokhlin towers. Contemporary Mathematics, 356:145, 2004.

See also

Rokhlin's lemma should not be confused with Rokhlin's theorem.

Ergodic theory